The 2019 Miami Hurricanes women's soccer team represented University of Miami during the 2019 NCAA Division I women's soccer season.  The Hurricanes were led by head coach Sarah Barnes, in her second season.  They played home games at Cobb Stadium.  This is the team's 21st season playing organized women's college soccer and their 16th playing in the Atlantic Coast Conference.

The Hurricanes finished the season 5–9–2 overall, and 2–7–1 in ACC play to finish in eleventh place.  They did not qualify for the ACC Tournament and were not invited to the NCAA Tournament.

Squad

Roster

Updated August 3, 2020

Team management

Source:

Schedule

Source:

|-
!colspan=6 style=""| Exhibition

|-
!colspan=6 style=""| Non-Conference Regular season

|-
!colspan=6 style=""| ACC Regular season

Rankings

References

Miami (FL)
Miami Hurricanes women's soccer seasons
2019 in sports in Florida